Sweat the Small Stuff is a British comedy panel show broadcast on BBC Three, presented by Nick Grimshaw and featuring team captains Melvin Odoom and Rochelle Humes. Humes, formerly a regular panellist, replaced Rickie Haywood Williams, who was a team captain in series 1.

On 14 March 2014, it was announced that the show had been recommissioned for a third and fourth series.

The show ended in December 2014.

Rounds
Grimmy's Sweats: (Series 1): Grimshaw gives the teams clues to a particular "sweat" or topic that has been affecting him that week, and the first team to guess what the sweat is wins a point for their team.

On the Quiff of Grimmy (Series 1–3): Grimshaw gets the great British public to swear 'on the quiff of Grimshaw', a wig of Grimshaw's hair, to give an honest answer to a question they are asked. The teams have to guess whether the person said yes or no.

The Challenges (Series 1–4): In this round, Rochelle competes against Melvin in a street challenge given to them by Grimshaw, which involves a number of tasks. The person who completes the most tasks is the winner. Rickie participated in this round in series one.

The Sweatbox (Series 1–4): In this round, a member of the studio audience goes into the 'Sweatbox', a small wooden hut in the studio, and tells the teams about their dilemma. The teams will give them their advice and the person must choose whose advice is better.

Grimmy Examinates (Series 2–3): Grimshaw investigates a particular "sweat" or topic provided by a listener of his BBC Radio 1 Breakfast Show. Grimshaw then invites the team to take part in a studio game relating to that sweat.

Quick Fire Sweats (Series 3): The teams pitch a sweat to the studio audience against the clock, in an attempt to prove to the majority of the audience that the sweat is truly annoying. If the sweat is annoying, the team wins a point.

Sweaty Headlines (series 4): The teams are shown pictures of three celebrities who have featured in the week's news, and have to guess which celebrity the studio audience believes has had the 'sweatiest' (worst) week of them all. A point is awarded to the winner.

Sweat Selector (Series 4): In this round, a number is generated from 1-99, and a sweat relating to that number is then revealed. The team captains or panelists then have to compete in a studio game or quiz related to that number to earn points for their team.

Transmissions

Series

Specials

Episodes
The coloured backgrounds denote the result of each of the shows:

 – indicates Rickie/Rochelle's team won
 – indicates Melvin's team won
 – indicates the game ended in a draw

Series 1 (2013)

Series 2 (2013)

Series 3 (2014)

Series 4 (2014–15)

Scores

Notes

References

External links

Sweat the Small Stuff: Extra Sweaty

2013 British television series debuts
2015 British television series endings
BBC television comedy
BBC panel games
British panel games
2010s British game shows
English-language television shows
Television series by Fremantle (company)
Television shows shot at Elstree Film Studios